Morton College is a public community college in Cicero, Illinois. It is the second oldest community college in the state. While the campus itself was constructed in 1975, the college was established in 1924. Before the construction of the campus, the college was housed in the same building as the local high school. It is named after Julius Sterling Morton, a Nebraska newspaper editor and politician who served as President Grover Cleveland's Secretary of Agriculture.

Land was acquired for an athletics field in 1994. Intercollegiate athletics for men include baseball, basketball, soccer, and cross country. Women's sports include volleyball, basketball, cross country, soccer and softball.

The college is a National Alternative Fuels Training Consortium training center. It also operates a low-power FM station, WZQC-LP, at 99.1 MHz.

References

External links
Official website

Community colleges in Illinois
Universities and colleges in Cook County, Illinois
Cicero, Illinois
Educational institutions established in 1924
NJCAA athletics
1924 establishments in Illinois